A dove is a type of bird, also called a pigeon.

Dove may also refer to:

Birds 
 In popular usage, often refers to small columbids that are used as symbols of peace, white or gray in color
 Barbary dove (Streptopelia risoria), a domestic species that is typically gray in colour, but often bred to be white
 Small white-feathered domestic pigeons (Columba livia domestica), which are used as release doves

People 
 Dove (given name), feminine given name in the English language
 Dove (surname), surname in the English language

Places

Extraterrestrial 
 Dove (crater), on the Moon
 Dove or Columba (constellation)

Terrestrial 
 Dove, Missouri, United States
 Dove Lake (Tasmania), Australia
 River Dove, Barnsley, England
 River Dove, Derbyshire, England
 River Dove, North Yorkshire, England
 River Dove, Suffolk, England
 The Dove (glacier), Colorado, United States
 The Dove, Hammersmith, a public house in London, England
 Dove Cottage, writer's home museum of William Wordsworth in Grasmere, England

Arts, entertainment, and media

Fictional characters 
 Hawk and Dove, a DC Comics superhero team
 "Little Dove", an alias for the character Sansa Stark in Game of Thrones

Music

Groups 
 Dove (band), an Australian soft rock band (1973–1978)
 Doves (band), an English band

Albums 
 Dove (Belly album), an album by American alternative rock band Belly
 Dove (Floor album), an album by American sludge metal band Floor

Songs 
 "Dove" (song), a song by Italian musician Mooney
 "Dove", a song by Tyrannosaurus Rex from their 1970 album A Beard of Stars

Other uses in music 
 Dove, an alias of American rapper David Jude Jolicoeur
 Dove (the Band of Love), Devo's fake opening act
 GMA Dove Awards, an American musical award
 Gibson Dove, a type of guitar

Brands and enterprises 
 Dove (chocolate), a Mars brand of chocolate named after the ice cream
 Dove (toiletries), an unrelated Unilever brand of soap and other personal care products

Military 
 HMS Dove (1898), a British destroyer
 Operation Dove (Ireland), an aborted 1940 German World War II mission
 Operation Dove, a 1944 Allied World War II assault in southern France

Science and technology 
 Dove (satellite), a constellation of small Earth-imaging satellites operated by Planet Labs
 Distributed Overlay Virtual Ethernet (DOVE), a tunneling and virtualization technology for computer networks
 Dove Marine Laboratory
 Dove tree
 Dove Medical Press

Vehicles 
 Dove (ship), 17th-century English trading ship re-created as the Maryland Dove
 Dove (steamboat)
 de Havilland Dove, a post–World War II short-haul airliner

Other uses 
 DoVE (Digitisation of Vital Events), a project of the General Register Office for England and Wales to digitise birth, marriage, and death records
 Dove Foundation, an American non-profit organization based in Portland, Oregon
 Dove Publications, an American publishing house headquartered in Mineola, New York
 Dove, slang for methylenedioxymethamphetamine
 Basel Dove, an 1845 Swiss postage stamp
 Monetary hawk and dove, someone who favors low unemployment in monetary policy
 War dove, a person favoring peace in a debate over whether to go to war
 Doves (Gibraltar) or palomos, a group of Gibraltarians that advocated, in the 1960s, for a settlement with Spain

See also 
 Doves as symbols
 Doves Press
 Hawk and dove (disambiguation)
 The Dove (disambiguation)